https://static.wikia.nocookie.net/prowrestling/images/c/c9/MCW_Heavyweight_Championship_%282017%29.jpg/revision/latest?cb=20170715222229

The MCW Heavyweight Championship is a professional wrestling heavyweight championship owned by the MCW Pro Wrestling (MCW) promotion. The title was created and debuted on October 11, 1998, at a MCW live event. In 2003, MCW ceased operations; at its last show MCW Last Dance on July 16, the MCW Heavyweight Championship was unified with the FTW Heavyweight and the MEWF Heavyweight Championships, when then–MCW Heavyweight Champion Danny Doring defeated MEWF Heavyweight Champion Romeo Valentino and FTW Heavyweight Champion Chris Chetti. MCW reopened in 2005 and held its first show on October 1, 2005, titled Fort Meade Wrestling. The MCW Heavyweight Championship was reinstated on March 26, 2006, at MCW's The Phenomenal Final Four event, where Julio Dinero won a tournament to become the champion.

Title reigns are determined either by professional wrestling matches between wrestlers involved in pre-existing scripted feuds and storylines, or by scripted circumstances. Wrestlers are portrayed as either villains or heroes as they follow a series of tension-building events, which culminate in a wrestling match or series of matches for the championship. Title changes happen at live events, which are usually released on DVD. The inaugural champion was Romeo Valentino, who defeated Corporal Punishment in the finals of a tournament to win the championship on October 11, 1998, at an MCW live event. As of November 2020, The Bruiser holds the record for most reigns, with eleven. At 435 days, Christian York's second reign is the longest in the title's history. The current champion is Robert Locke, who is in his first reign.  Overall, there have been 56 reigns shared between 30 wrestlers.

Title history

Combined reigns

References
General

Specific

External links
 MCW Heavyweight Championship

MCW Pro Wrestling championships
Heavyweight wrestling championships